Redpa is a locality and small rural community in the local government area of Circular Head, in the North West region of Tasmania. The Bass Highway passes through from east to west. The Arthur River forms part of the southern boundary. The 2016 census determined a population of 97 for the state suburb of Redpa.

History
The name is believed to be an Aboriginal word meaning "mosquito". The locality was settled in the late nineteenth century.

It was gazetted in 1971 and confirmed in 1972.

The police station and service was the last in Tasmania to have horses as the main means of transport.

Road infrastructure
The C213 route (Comeback Road) terminates at the Bass Highway in Redpa. It runs north and then west through the locality before turning south and rejoining the Bass Highway in Marrawah.

References

Localities of Circular Head Council
Towns in Tasmania